Feminization may refer to:

 Feminization (biology), the hormonally induced development of female sexual characteristics
 Feminization (activity), a sexual or lifestyle practice where a person assumes a female role
 Feminization (sociology), a perceived societal shift of gender roles toward the characteristically "female"
 Feminization of agriculture, the measurable increase of women's participation in agriculture
 Feminization of the face, a set of reconstructive surgical procedures that alter typically male facial features to bring them closer in shape and size to typical female facial features
 Feminization of language, the process of making a word or name female
 Feminization of migration, a trend where a higher rate of women migrate to labor or marriage
 Feminization of poverty, a phenomenon in which women represent disproportionate percentages of the world's poor
 Feminization of voice, the desired goal of changing a perceived male sounding voice to a perceived female sounding voice
 Feminisation of the workplace, the trend towards greater employment of women, and of men willing and able to operate with these more 'feminine' modes of interaction

See also
 Feminine